Saint Rusticus of Narbonne (in French Saint Rustique) (d. 26 October perhaps 461 AD) was a monk of the Lérins Abbey and bishop of Narbonne and Catholic saint of Gaul, born either at Marseilles or at Narbonne.

According to the Roman Martyrology, when he had completed his education in Gaul, Rusticus went to Rome, where he soon gained a reputation as a public speaker, but he wished to embrace the contemplative life. Thus Rusticus entered the Lérins Abbey. 

He was ordained at Marseilles, and on October 3, 430 (or 427) was consecrated Bishop of Narbonne. He was present at the First Council of Ephesus in 431 With all his zeal, he could not prevent the progress of the Arian heresy which the Goths were spreading abroad; there is evidence that an Arian rival bishop was established in Narbonne.

The siege of Narbonne by the Goths in 436 and dissensions among the Catholics so disheartened him that he wrote to Pope Leo I, renouncing the bishopric, but St. Leo dissuaded him (Epistle CLXVII).

Rusticus then endeavored to consolidate the Catholics. In 444–448, he rebuilt the church in Narbonne dedicated to Saint Genès of Arles, which had burned in 441; in 451, he assisted at the convocation of forty-four bishops of Gaul and approved St. Leo's letter to Flavian, concerning Nestorianism; he was present also at a Council of Arles, with thirteen bishops, to decide the debate between Theodore, Bishop of Fréjus, and the Abbey of Lérins. He was one of the twelve bishops who assembled to elect Ravennius bishop of Arles in 449; a letter from Ravennius to Rusticus, proves the high esteem in which he was held. Rusticus' own letters are lost, with the exception of the one to St. Jerome and two others to St. Leo, written either in 452 or 458.

Notes

References

Catholic Encyclopedia: "Rusticus of Narbonne"
Letter of Leo the Great (CLXVII) to Rusticus

Further reading
Marrou, Henri-Irenee, "Le dossier epigraphique de l'eveque Rusticus de Narbonne," Rivista di archeologia cristiana 3-4 (1970) pp 331– 349.

461 deaths
Bishops of Narbonne
5th-century bishops in Gaul
5th-century Christian saints
Gallo-Roman saints
Year of birth unknown